K. M. Tharakan (1930–2003) was a noted Indian critic, novelist, litterateur and educationalist from Kerala. He was the President of the Kerala Sahitya Akademi.

Biography

Early life 

K. M. Tharakan was born on 6 October 1930 at Puthencavu, the son of Mariamma and Mahakavi Puthencavu Mathan Tharakan. He was married to Rachel Tharakan. He had two sons and two daughters.

In 1946, he completed his SSLC in English medium from the Chengannur English High School. He obtained his Master of Arts degree in Literature from the Banaras Hindu University. After his MA he continued with his studies in Religion & Culture at the Pittsburgh Theological Seminary.

Career 

Tharakan worked as a lecturer at St. Albert's College from 1952 to 1959. From 1959 to 1979, he worked at Mar Athanasius College of Arts, Kothamangalam, retiring in 1980 as the department head. He was appointed as the editor of the Malayala Manorama Weekly in 1979 and also served as the editor of Bhashaposhini. In 1991 he was appointed as the President of the Kerala Sahitya Akademi.
He authored over 50 books and various literary critiques and articles. He also translated many Malayalam works into English. He was awarded a Ph.D. from Mahatma Gandhi University in 1995 for his thesis, Theory of Synaesthesis in the Perspective of Rasa Sidantha.

Among other awards, he was awarded the Kerala Sahitya Akademi award in 1975 for his work Paschathya Sahitya Thatwasastram, a literary criticism.

Death 

K. M. Tharakan died on 16 July 2003, at a private hospital in Tiruvalla after a prolonged illness. He was buried at St. Mary's Orthodox Cathedral in Puthencavu.

K. M. Tharakan Foundation 

The K. M. Tharakan Foundation was set up in 1990 in his honour. The foundation awards the Aacharya Award, which carries a citation and a cash prize of US$100. The award is given to individuals who make significant contributions in the fields of society, culture and education. Winners of the Aacharya Award include Cyriac Thomas, D. Babu Paul and Fr. V. M. Varghese Kallooparambil.

Selected works

Critiques 

 Tarangini (1970)
 Pattu novalukal (1970)
 Atyadhinika sahityam (1971)
 Adhhunikha sahityadarshanam (1980)
 Nobel Sammanrhar (1981)
 Moral foundations of the Indian civilisation
 Western and Eastern Poetics: A Comparative Study of Reader Response in I. A. Richards and Abhinavagupta

Novels 

 Avalannu bharya 
 Ninakkayi mathram
 Ormakalude rathri
 Athmavil sugandham
 Ennil aliyunna dukham

Biographies 

 M P Paul (1999)
 O Chanthumenon (1994)
 K C Mammen Mappilai – Portrait of KC Mammen Mappilai (1998)
 Kesava Dev – Thoolika padavaalakiya Kesava Dev (1986)
 Anugraheethanaya Basheer (1989)

References 

Malayalam-language writers
Malayali people
1930 births
2003 deaths
Writers from Alappuzha
Mahatma Gandhi University, Kerala alumni
Banaras Hindu University alumni
Indian male novelists
Malayalam novelists
Indian critics
20th-century Indian writers
People from Thiruvalla
Tharakan titleholders